Burnage railway station is a railway station in south Manchester, England, in the suburb of Burnage on the Styal Line. The station is served by Manchester – Crewe Northern Trains stopping services to Manchester Airport. It caters mainly for commuter traffic, being electrified at 25 kV AC overhead, and is used by EMU traffic.

Since May 2018 services operate on a 'skip-stop' basis at irregular intervals to increase capacity on the line. As a designated Northern Connect stop, a direct express service to Blackpool North via  was introduced as part of this timetable change. This was replaced by calls on services between / and  running via  as part of the December 2019 timetable change.

Services

References

Further reading

External links

Manchester Local Image Collection
Burnage Station looking west along Fog Lane, 1934
Burnage Station looking east along Fog Lane, 1934
Southbound platform Burnage Station during reconstruction, 1958
Northbound platform Burnage Station during reconstruction, 1958
Southbound platform Burnage Station from Fog Lane, 1960
Northbound platform Burnage Station from Fog Lane, 1960
Burnage Station during 2007 redevelopment (27 January 2007)

Railway stations in Manchester
DfT Category E stations
Former London and North Western Railway stations
Railway stations in Great Britain opened in 1910
Northern franchise railway stations